Odda is a former municipality in the old Hordaland county, Norway. The municipality existed from 1913 until its dissolution in 2020 when it was merged into Ullensvang Municipality in Vestland county. It was located in southeastern Hordaland county, surrounding the southern end of the Sørfjorden. The administrative centre was the town of Odda, which was also the main commercial and economic centre of the entire Hardanger region. Other villages in the municipality included Botnen, Eitrheim, Håra, Røldal, Seljestad, Skare, and Tyssedal.

Prior to its dissolution in 2020, the  municipality was the 42nd largest by area out of the 422 municipalities in Norway. Odda is the 150th most populous municipality in Norway with a population of 7,025.

In 1927, Erling Johnson, working at Odda Smelteverk, invented a process to produce three-component, NPK fertilizers. This process is now known as the Odda process.

General information

The municipality of Odda was established on 1 July 1913 when the southern district of Ullensvang was separated out to form its own municipality. Initially, Odda had 3,077 residents. During the 1960s, there were many municipal mergers across Norway due to the work of the Schei Committee. On 1 January 1964, the neighboring municipality of Røldal (population: 676) was merged into Odda, bringing the total population of the new municipality to 10,163 residents.

On 1 January 2020, the three neighboring municipalities of Jondal, Odda, and Ullensvang were merged. The new municipality is called Ullensvang and its administrative centre is the town of Odda.

Name
The municipality (originally the parish) is named after the old "Odda" farm, since the first Odda Church was built there. The name is identical with the word oddi which means "headland".

Coat of arms
The coat of arms was granted on 8 October 1982. The arms show a canting of an arrowhead (Norwegian language: pilodd). The name of the municipality, however, is not derived from the word for arrowhead.

Churches
The Church of Norway had four parishes within the municipality of Odda. It is part of the Hardanger og Voss prosti (deanery) in the Diocese of Bjørgvin.

History

{{Historical populations
|footnote = Source: Statistics Norway.
|shading = off
|1951|8807
|1960|9584
|1970|10051
|1980|9183
|1990|8289
|2000|7727
|2010|7047
|2017|7025
}}
The Røldal Stave Church was built in the years 1200–1250 in the present-day village of Røldal. This is one of the oldest structures in the municipality.

During the 19th century, Odda became a significant tourist destination. Visits ranged from English pioneers around 1830 to the German Emperor Kaiser Wilhelm II, who visited Odda every year between 1891 and 1914. This led to the construction of several hotels in the municipality.

Odda Municipality was centred on a modern town which grew up around smelters built at the head of the Sørfjorden branch of the Hardangerfjord in the mid-twentieth century, drawing migrants from different parts of Norway.

The carbide production and the subsequent production of cyanamide was started in 1908 after the water power plant was operational and provided the necessary electricity for the arc furnaces. The plant was the largest in the world and remained operational till 2003 shortly after the plant was sold to Philipp Brothers Chemicals Inc. The Norwegian government tried to get the site recognized together with other industrial plants as a UNESCO World Heritage Site. In 2010 an international report stated: What makes Odda smelteverk so important and central to the application of Norway’s hydro power sites and pioneer chemical industry as a World Heritage Site is the fact that here in an internationally unique way the physical remains of an early chemical production process are still present.''

Dialect

Odda grew up around this smelter in the early-twentieth century, drawing migrants from different parts of Norway. As a result, there developed a new dialect, a mixture of that spoken in the home regions of the migrants - a phenomenon termed by linguists "a Koiné language". The town of Odda and neighboring village of Tyssedal - which arose in the same time and socio-economic circumstances as those of Odda - provided valuable insights to linguists studying this phenomenon. The researcher Paul Kerswill conducted an intensive study of the Norwegian spoken in the two communities, relating them to very different geographical origins: The workers in Odda came predominantly (86%) from western Norway. In Tyssedal only about one third came from western Norway; one third came from eastern Norway; and the rest from other parts of the country. The dialects that evolved in these two communities were radically different from each other, though spoken at a short geographical distance from each other.

Government

The municipal council  of Odda was made up of 27 representatives that were elected to four year terms. The party breakdown of the final municipal council was as follows:

Geography

Odda municipality was very mountainous and the settlements were all located in valleys. Because of the many mountains, there were many large waterfalls including Låtefossen, Espelandsfossen, and Tyssestrengene. There are also many large lakes such as Sandvinvatnet, Votna, Valldalsvatnet, Røldalsvatnet, Ringedalsvatnet, Langavatnet, and parts of Ståvatn. On top of the high mountains in western Odda is the vast Folgefonna glacier, including the Buarbreen glacier near the town of Odda. Part of Folgefonna National Park is in Odda. The western part of the municipality sits on top of the southern part of the Hardangervidda plateau, which also includes part of the Hardangervidda National Park. The mountains Kistenuten and Sandfloegga are located on the plateau.

Transportation
The municipality sat at a crossroads of two major roads. The European route E134 highway runs east–west through Odda municipality, cutting through many mountains in the Røldal Tunnel, Horda Tunnel, Austmannali Tunnel, and Haukeli Tunnel. The other main road is the Norwegian National Road 13 which runs north–south through the municipality. The two roads run together from Seljestad to Håra. At Eitrheim, the Folgefonna Tunnel connects Odda to the neighboring area of Mauranger in Kvinnherad Municipality, cutting through the mountains under the Folgefonna glacier.

Health care
Odda Hospital provides health services to the inhabitants of Hardanger. The ambulance station, Folgefonn DPS Odda and the municipal hospital are also located in the hospital area. The population can also receive health services at local health stations.

In popular culture
The town is used as the backdrop for the fictional town of Edda in the Netflix Norwegian-language drama series Ragnarok.

See also
List of former municipalities of Norway

References

External links

Municipal fact sheet from Statistics Norway 

 
Ullensvang
Former municipalities of Norway
1913 establishments in Norway
2020 disestablishments in Norway
States and territories established in 1913
States and territories disestablished in 2020